Established in 1993, The Covenant Preparatory School (previously named Northeast Christian Academy) is a private college preparatory Christian school located in the Kingwood area of Houston, Texas. The school consists of Pre-K through 12th Grade.

Location map

References

External links

 

Christian schools in Houston
Christianity in Houston
Private K-12 schools in Houston